The Ordinary Mind Zen School is a network of independent Zen centers established by Charlotte Joko Beck and her Dharma Successors in 1995.

History

The school is unaffiliated with any Zen centers which fall outside of its own network, however many Ordinary Mind Zen teachers are members of the White Plum Asanga. The history of the Ordinary Mind Zen School dates back to 1983, which was the year that Joko Beck had left the Zen Center of Los Angeles. That was the year her teacher, Hakuyu Taizan Maezumi, had been confronted by his students about his alcoholism and sexual liaisons with some female students. Joko Beck established the Zen Center of San Diego in 1983, currently run by Ezra Bayda and Elizabeth Hamilton, though Joko Beck had disassociated herself from these teachers.

According to Richard Hughes Seager, "By 1998, the Ordinary Mind School had centers in San Diego, Champaign, Illinois, Oakland, California, Portland, Oregon and New York City." There is no one set structure of curriculum in the Ordinary Mind School, as the Dharma Successors of Joko Beck get to decide their method of training independent of any organizational head. Long before retirement, Joko Beck had done away with all titles and no longer wore her okesa. She had distanced herself considerably from her roots in the Sōtō school, and much of the ceremony had been abandoned in favor of pure meditation practice.

Teachers
Barry Magid (Ordinary Mind Zendo)
Pat Jikyo George (Zen Center of Philadelphia)
Elihu Genmyo Smith (Prairie Zen Center)
Diane Rizzetto (Bay Zen Center)
Dan Birnbaum (Bay Zen Center)
Gregg Howard (Ordinary Mind Zen Brisbane)
Geoff Dawson (Ordinary Mind Zen Sydney)
Andrew Tootell (OzZen)
Peg Syverson (Appamada in Austin, TX)
Karen Terzano (Ordinary Mind Zendo Finland & Sweden)
Malcolm Martin (Ordinary Mind Zendo UK)
Ezra Bayda 
Elizabeth Hamilton 
Al Zolynas (Freeway Zen, Escondido, CA)
Diane Moore (Santa Rosa Zen Group)
Ezequiel D´León Masís (SAMU - Zen Lab, Nicaragua)
Anna Christensen
Timo Teräväinen (Ordinary Mind Zendo Finland)
Magnus Norén (Ordinary Mind Zendo Sweden)
Vincent Leo Jensen (Ordinary Mind Zendo Bellingen, Australia)

Dissolved Groups
Larry Christensen (Zen Center of Portland)

See also
Buddhism in the United States
Timeline of Zen Buddhism in the United States

Further reading

References

External links
Ordinary Mind Zendo
Zen Center of Philadelphia
Zen Center of Portland
Prairie Zen Center
Bay Zen Center
Ordinary Mind Zen Brisbane
Ordinary Mind Zen Sydney
Appamada in Austin, TX
Ordinary Mind Zendo Finland
Ordinary Mind Zen Galway, Ireland
Freeway Zen Escondido, California
Santa Rosa Zen Group
Zen Center San Diego
SAMU Zen Lab, Nicaragua

Buddhist orders
Schools of Buddhism founded in the United States
Zen sects